Lucasta Frances Elizabeth Miller (born 5 June 1966) is an English writer and literary journalist.

Education
Miller was educated at Westminster School and Lady Margaret Hall, in Oxford, receiving a congratulatory first in English in 1988. She was awarded a PhD at the University of East Anglia in 2007.

Career
Miller worked as deputy literary editor of the Independent in the mid-1990s. Known for her study in metabiography, The Bronte Myth (published by  Jonathan Cape in the UK  in 2001 and Knopf in the USA in 2003) she has also been a contributor to the Guardian, as a profile and comment writer, a reviewer for  the Times Literary Supplement and the Economist and was one of the judges of the Man Booker Prize in 2009. Miller wrote the preface for a Penguin Classics edition of Wuthering Heights in 2003.  She has been a trustee of the London Library and the Wordsworth Trust and was the founding editorial director of Notting Hill Editions. In the academic year 2015-16 she was Beaufort visiting fellow at Lady Margaret Hall and a visiting scholar at Wolfson College, Oxford.

Miller's biography of Letitia Elizabeth Landon, L.E.L. The Lost Life and Scandalous Death of Letitia Landon, the celebrated “female Byron”, was published by Knopf and Jonathan Cape in 2019: “Ms Miller ... analyzes with revelatory insight ...this infinitely rich literary biography”  (The Wall Street Journal )

Personal life
In 1992 Miller married the tenor Ian Bostridge. They have two children and live in London.

References

External links
Website of Lucasta Miller*

1966 births
Living people
People educated at Westminster School, London
Alumni of Lady Margaret Hall, Oxford
Alumni of the University of East Anglia
British writers
British journalists
People educated at South Hampstead High School